Santa Monica City Hall is a government building in Santa Monica, California.

See also

 List of City of Santa Monica Designated Historic Landmarks
 Santa Monica City Council

External links
 
 A Guide to Historic Santa Monica City Hall

Buildings and structures in Santa Monica, California
Government buildings in California